Chamaesphecia is a genus of moths in the family Sesiidae.

Species

Subgenus Chamaesphecia Spuler, 1910
Chamaesphecia adelpha Le Cerf, 1938
Chamaesphecia amygdaloidis Schleppnik, 1933
Chamaesphecia anthracias Le Cerf, 1937
Chamaesphecia anthraciformis (Rambur, 1832)
Chamaesphecia astatiformis (Herrich-Schäffer, 1846)
Chamaesphecia bibioniformis (Esper, 1800)
Chamaesphecia crassicornis Bartel, 1912
Chamaesphecia cyanopasta (Hampson, 1910)
Chamaesphecia darvazica Gorbunov, 2001
Chamaesphecia emba Gorbunov, 2001
Chamaesphecia empiformis (Esper, 1783)
Chamaesphecia euceraeformis (Ochsenheimer, 1816)
Chamaesphecia guriensis (Emich von Emöke, 1872)
Chamaesphecia hungarica (Tomala, 1901)
Chamaesphecia iranica Le Cerf, 1937
Chamaesphecia kautti Špatenka, 1997
Chamaesphecia keili Kallies & Špatenka, 2003
Chamaesphecia kistenjovi Gorbunov, 1991a
Chamaesphecia leucocnemis Le Cerf, 1938
Chamaesphecia leucopsiformis (Esper, 1800)
Chamaesphecia mezentzevi Gorbunov, 1989
Chamaesphecia murzini Gorbunov, 2001
Chamaesphecia mutilata (Staudinger, 1887)
Chamaesphecia nigrifrons (Le Cerf, 1911)
Chamaesphecia palustris Kautz, 1927
Chamaesphecia schizoceriformis (Kolenati, 1846)
Chamaesphecia schroederi Toševski, 1993b
Chamaesphecia sogdianica Špatenka, 1987
Chamaesphecia taurica Špatenka, 1997
Chamaesphecia tenthrediniformis ([Denis & Schiffermüller], 1775)
Chamaesphecia thomyris Le Cerf, 1938
Chamaesphecia turbida Le Cerf, 1937
Chamaesphecia uilica Gorbunov, 2001

Subgenus Scopulosphecia Laštuvka, [1990]
Chamaesphecia aerifrons (Zeller, 1847b:415)
Chamaesphecia aerifrons aerifrons (Zeller, 1847)
Chamaesphecia aerifrons sardoa (Staudinger, 1856:281)
Chamaesphecia albida Špatenka, 1999:365
Chamaesphecia albiventris (Lederer, 1853)
Chamaesphecia alysoniformis (Herrich-Schäffer, 1846)
Chamaesphecia anatolica Schwingenschuss, 1938
Chamaesphecia annellata (Zeller, 1847)
Chamaesphecia aurifera (Romanoff, 1885)
Chamaesphecia azonos (Lederer, 1855)
Chamaesphecia blandita Gorbunov & Špatenka, 2001
Chamaesphecia chalciformis (Esper, [1804])
Chamaesphecia christophi Gorbunov & Špatenka, 2001
Chamaesphecia chrysoneura Püngeler, 1912
Chamaesphecia chrysoneura chrysoneura Püngeler, 1912
Chamaesphecia chrysoneura melanophleps Zukowsky, 1935
Chamaesphecia diabarensis Gorbunov, 1987b:14
Chamaesphecia doleriformis (Herrich-Schäffer, 1846)
Chamaesphecia doleriformis doleriformis (Herrich-Schäffer, 1846)
Chamaesphecia doleriformis colpiformis (Staudinger, 1856)
Chamaesphecia doryceraeformis (Lederer, 1853)
Chamaesphecia dumonti Le Cerf, 1922
Chamaesphecia elampiformis (Herrich-Schäffer, 1851)
Chamaesphecia elampiformis elampiformis (Herrich-Schäffer, 1851)
Chamaesphecia elampiformis mandana (Le Cerf, 1938)
Chamaesphecia ferganae Sheljuzhko, 1924
Chamaesphecia festai Turati, 1925
Chamaesphecia fredi Le Cerf, 1938
Chamaesphecia gorbunovi Špatenka, 1992
Chamaesphecia guenter Herrmann & Hofmann, 1997
Chamaesphecia haberhaueri (Staudinger, 1879)
Chamaesphecia inexpectata (Le Cerf, 1938)
Chamaesphecia infernalis Sheljuzhko, 1935
Chamaesphecia jitkae Špatenka, 1987
Chamaesphecia leucoparea (Lederer, 1872)
Chamaesphecia margiana Püngeler, 1912
Chamaesphecia masariformis (Ochsenheimer, 1808)
Chamaesphecia masariformis masariformis (Ochsenheimer, 1808)
Chamaesphecia masariformis odyneriformis (Herrich-Schäffer, 1846)
Chamaesphecia maurusia Püngeler, 1912
Chamaesphecia minoica Bartsch & Pühringer, 2005
Chamaesphecia minor (Staudinger, 1856)
Chamaesphecia mirza Le Cerf, 1938
Chamaesphecia morosa Le Cerf, 1937
Chamaesphecia mudjahida Špatenka, 1997
Chamaesphecia mysiniformis (Boisduval, 1840)
Chamaesphecia obraztsovi Sheljuzhko, 1943
Chamaesphecia obraztsovi obraztsovi Sheljuzhko, 1943
Chamaesphecia obraztsovi obermajeri Špatenka, 1992
Chamaesphecia ophimontana Gorbunov, 1991
Chamaesphecia osmiaeformis (Herrich-Schäffer, 1848
Chamaesphecia oxybeliformis (Herrich-Schäffer, 1846)
Chamaesphecia pechi (Staudinger, 1887)
Chamaesphecia proximata (Staudinger, 1891)
Chamaesphecia purpurea Spatenka & Kallies, 2006
Chamaesphecia ramburi (Staudinger, 1866)
Chamaesphecia regula (Staudinger, 1891)
Chamaesphecia ruficoronata Kallies, Petersen & Riefenstahl, 1998
Chamaesphecia schmidtiiformis (Freyer, 1836)
Chamaesphecia schwingenschussi (Le Cerf, 1937)
Chamaesphecia sefid Le Cerf, 1938
Chamaesphecia sertavulensis Gorbunov & Špatenka, 2001
Chamaesphecia staudingeri (Failla-Tedaldi, 1890)
Chamaesphecia tahira Kallies & Petersen, 1995
Chamaesphecia thracica Laštuvka, 1983
Chamaesphecia weidenhofferi Špatenka, 1997
Chamaesphecia xantho Le Cerf, 1937
Chamaesphecia xanthosticta (Hampson, [1893])
Chamaesphecia xanthotrigona Bartsch & Kallies, 2008
Chamaesphecia zarathustra Gorbunov & Špatenka, 1992
Chamaesphecia zimmermannii (Lederer, 1872)
Incertae sedis
Chamaesphecia atramentaria Zukowsky, 1950
Chamaesphecia aurata (Edwards, 1881)
Chamaesphecia borsanii Köhler, 1953
Chamaesphecia breyeri Köhler, 1941
Chamaesphecia penthetria Zukowsky, 1936
Chamaesphecia pluto Zukowsky, 1936
Chamaesphecia andrianony Viette, 1982
Chamaesphecia clathrata Le Cerf, 1917
Chamaesphecia lemur Le Cerf, 1957
Chamaesphecia seyrigi Le Cerf, 1957
Chamaesphecia tritonias Hampson, 1919

References

Sesiidae